MGM Animation/Visual Arts was an American animation studio established in 1962 by animation director/producer Chuck Jones, producer Les Goldman and animator Ken Harris as Sib Tower 12 Productions. Its productions include the last series of Tom and Jerry theatrical shorts, the TV specials Horton Hears a Who! and How the Grinch Stole Christmas!, and the feature film The Phantom Tollbooth, all released by Metro-Goldwyn-Mayer.

History 
The studio was founded in 1960 as "S I B Productions, Inc.", which in 1962 had hired the just developing Filmation Associates to animate a syndicated series called Rod Rocket. It afterward evolved into "Sib Tower 12, Inc.", being taken over by Chuck Jones after he was fired from Warner Bros. Cartoons, because he was in violation of his contract where he had served for over 30 years directing the Looney Tunes and Merrie Melodies series. A number of animators who had worked under Jones during his Warner Bros. career followed him to Sib Tower 12, as did voice actor Mel Blanc and storyman and writer Michael Maltese. Sib Tower 12 Productions received a contract from Metro-Goldwyn-Mayer to produce a new series of Tom and Jerry cartoons, which proved successful. As a result, MGM purchased the Sib Tower 12 studio and renamed it MGM Animation/Visual Arts in 1964. This studio continued with Jones' Tom and Jerry shorts until 1967.

In addition to the Tom and Jerry cartoons, Jones worked on the short, The Dot and the Line (1965), an abstract piece based upon a children's book by Norton Juster, which won that year's Academy Award for Animated Short Film.

The studio also turned to television, producing two highly acclaimed TV specials based on books by Dr. Seuss. How the Grinch Stole Christmas!, which aired in 1966, and Horton Hears a Who! in 1970.

The studio's most ambitious work was its 1970 feature film The Phantom Tollbooth, adapted from another Norton Juster book.

After the studio closed in late 1970, Chuck Jones went on to found Chuck Jones Film Productions which produced television specials based on the stories of Rudyard Kipling and of The Cricket in Times Square series. In 1993, MGM opened a new animation studio, MGM Animation.

Filmography

Theatrical cartoon shorts 
Majority of studio's output were Tom and Jerry cartoons, but the studio also produced standalone shorts.

Tom and Jerry
1963
Pent-House Mouse  
 1964 
 The Cat Above and the Mouse Below  
 Is There a Doctor in the Mouse?  
 Much Ado About Mousing 
 Snowbody Loves Me  
 The Unshrinkable Jerry Mouse  
 1965 
 Ah, Sweet Mouse-Story of Life 
 Tom-ic Energy 
 Bad Day at Cat Rock  
 The Brothers Carry-Mouse-Off  
 Haunted Mouse  
 I'm Just Wild About Jerry  
 Of Feline Bondage  
 The Year of the Mouse  
 The Cat's Me-Ouch! 

 1966 
 Duel Personality  
 Jerry, Jerry, Quite Contrary  
 Jerry-Go-Round  
 Love Me, Love My Mouse  
 Puss 'n' Boats 
 Filet Meow  
 Matinee Mouse  
 The A-Tom-Inable Snowman  
 Catty-Cornered  

 1967 
 Cat and Dupli-cat 
 O-Solar Meow 
 Guided Mouse-ille  
 Rock 'n' Rodent  
 Cannery Rodent  
 The Mouse from H.U.N.G.E.R.  
 Surf-Bored Cat  
 Shutter Bugged Cat 
 Advance and Be Mechanized  
 Purr-Chance to Dream

One-shots
 The Dot and the Line (1965)
 The Bear That Wasn't (1967)

Television shows 
 Tom and Jerry (1965) (bumpers, and reanimation of sequences from the original Hanna-Barbera shorts.)
 Off to See the Wizard (1967–1968)

Television specials 
 How the Grinch Stole Christmas! (1966)
 The Pogo Special Birthday Special (1969)
 Horton Hears a Who! (1970)

Feature films 
 The Phantom Tollbooth (1970)

See also 
 Metro-Goldwyn-Mayer cartoon studio
 Metro-Goldwyn-Mayer Animation
 List of Metro-Goldwyn-Mayer theatrical animated feature films
 Chuck Jones Film Productions
 Turner Entertainment Co.
 Warner Bros. Animation

Notes

References 
 Maltin, Leonard, Of Mice and Magic: A History of American Animated Cartoons, New York: NAL Books, 1987, 

 
American animation studios
American companies established in 1962
American companies disestablished in 1970
Entertainment companies based in California
Mass media companies established in 1962
Mass media companies disestablished in 1970
1962 establishments in California
1970 disestablishments in California
Companies based in Culver City, California
Defunct companies based in Greater Los Angeles
Former Metro-Goldwyn-Mayer subsidiaries
1964 mergers and acquisitions